The following are the football (soccer) events of the year 1956 throughout the world.

Events
November 3 – Dutch club Rapid JC makes its European debut with a defeat (3-4) on home soil against Yugoslavia's Red Star Belgrade in the second round of the European Cup.
Foundation of Royal Thai Navy F.C.

Winners club national championship
 : River Plate
 : Manchester United
 : Nice
 : Maccabi Tel Aviv F.C.
 : ACF Fiorentina
 : León
  Paraguay: Olimpia Asunción
 : FC Spartak Moscow
  Spain: Atlético Bilbao
 : IFK Norrköping
 : Borussia Dortmund

International tournaments
Olympic Games in Melbourne, Australia (November 24 – December 8, 1956)
 
 
 
1956 British Home Championship (October 22, 1955 – April 14, 1956)

Births

January
 January 16: Martin Jol (Dutch footballer and manager)
 January 17: Faouzi Mansouri (Algerian footballer) (died 2022)
 January 31: Stefan Majewski (Polish footballer)

February
 February 14: Reinhold Hintermaier (Austrian footballer)
 February 18: Rüdiger Abramczik (German footballer)
 February 25: Davie Cooper (Scottish footballer) (died 1995)
 February 28: Jimmy Nicholl (Northern Irish footballer)

March
 March 3: Zbigniew Boniek, Polish international footballer
 March 4: Philippe Mahut, French international footballer (died 2014)
 March 12: László Kiss, Hungarian footballer
 March 12: Pim Verbeek, Dutch footballer and manager (died 2019)
 March 15: Gilberto Yearwood, Honduran footballer
 March 24: Włodzimierz Ciołek, Polish footballer
 March 29: Ferenc Csongrádi, Hungarian footballer
 March 29: Dick Jol, Dutch football referee

April
 April 12: František Jakubec; Czech international footballer (died 2016)

May
 May 3: Bernd Förster (German international footballer)
 May 19: Jan Fiala (Czech footballer)

June
 June 5: Martin Koopman (Dutch footballer)
 June 12: David Narey (Scottish footballer)
 June 26: Maxime Bossis (French footballer)

July
 July 15: Emmanuel Kunde (Cameroonian footballer)
 July 20: Thomas N'Kono (Cameroonian footballer)
 July 29: Jean-Luc Ettori (French footballer)

August
 August 16: Patricio Hernández (Argentinian footballer)
 August 27: Jean-François Larios (French footballer)
 August 29: Viv Anderson (English footballer)

September
 September 8: Jacky Munaron (Belgian footballer)
 September 14: Béla Bodonyi (Hungarian footballer) 
 September 14: Ray Wilkins (English footballer) (died 2018)
 September 23: Paolo Rossi (Italian footballer) (died 2020)
 September 30: Frank Arnesen (Danish footballer)

October
 October 10: Raúl Gorriti, Peruvian international footballer (died 2015)
 October 28: Frank Vercauteren (Belgian international footballer)

November
 November 4: Jan Korte (Dutch footballer and manager)
 November 10: José Luis Brown Argentine international footballer, (died 2019)
 November 16: Max Hagmayr (Austrian footballer)
 November 18: Noel Brotherston (Northern Irish footballer) (died 1995)

December
 December 6:  Klaus Allofs (German footballer)
 December 9:  Oscar Garré (Argentine footballer)
 December 10: Jan van Dijk (Dutch footballer and manager)
 December 11:  Ricardo Giusti (Argentine footballer)

Deaths

August
 August 12 – Gianpiero Combi, 53, Italian goalkeeper, captaining winner of the 1934 FIFA World Cup and one of Italy's greatest goalkeepers of all-time.

October
 October 16 - Jules Rimet, 83, 3rd president of FIFA.
 October 24 - Tom Whittaker, 58, Arsenal manager, heart attack

References

External links
Olympic Football Tournament Melbourne 1956, FIFA.com
RSSSF Archive

 
Association football by year